The Canton of Gournay-en-Bray is a canton situated in the Seine-Maritime département and in the Normandy region of northern France.

Geography 
An area of farming and associated light industry, centred on the town of Gournay-en-Bray.

Composition 
At the French canton reorganisation which came into effect in March 2015, the canton was expanded from 16 to 67 communes (2 of which merged into the commune of Forges-les-Eaux):

Argueil
Aubéguimont
Aumale
Avesnes-en-Bray
Beaubec-la-Rosière
Beaussault
Beauvoir-en-Lyons
La Bellière
Bézancourt
Bosc-Hyons
Brémontier-Merval
Le Caule-Sainte-Beuve
La Chapelle-Saint-Ouen
Compainville
Conteville
Criquiers
Croisy-sur-Andelle
Cuy-Saint-Fiacre
Dampierre-en-Bray
Doudeauville
Elbeuf-en-Bray
Ellecourt
Ernemont-la-Villette
Ferrières-en-Bray
La Ferté-Saint-Samson
La Feuillie
Forges-les-Eaux
Fry
Gaillefontaine
Gancourt-Saint-Étienne
Gournay-en-Bray
Grumesnil
La Hallotière
Haucourt
Haudricourt
Haussez
La Haye
Le Héron
Hodeng-Hodenger
Illois
Landes-Vieilles-et-Neuves
Longmesnil
Marques
Mauquenchy
Ménerval
Mésangueville
Le Mesnil-Lieubray
Mesnil-Mauger
Molagnies
Montroty
Morienne
Morville-sur-Andelle
Neuf-Marché 
Nolléval
Nullemont
Pommereux
Richemont
Roncherolles-en-Bray
Ronchois
Rouvray-Catillon
Saint-Lucien
Saint-Michel-d'Halescourt
Saumont-la-Poterie
Serqueux
Sigy-en-Bray
Le Thil-Riberpré
Vieux-Rouen-sur-Bresle

Population

See also 
 Arrondissements of the Seine-Maritime department
 Cantons of the Seine-Maritime department
 Communes of the Seine-Maritime department

References

Gournay-en-Bray